"A Passage for Trumpet" is episode 32 of the American television series The Twilight Zone.

Opening narration

The narration continues after dialogue between Joey and Baron.

Plot
Joey Crown is a hapless trumpet player in New York City; he has no money, no friends, and no job prospects due to alcoholism. Looking for a chance to work again, he is turned down by the manager at his old club, who while appreciating Joey's abilities, knows how unreliable he is. Joey feels his life is worthless. He sells his beloved trumpet at a pawn shop for cash then, after a drinking binge, impulsively steps into the path of a speeding truck. When he comes to, he realizes that nobody can see or hear him and assumes that he is dead. None of the people he sees are ones he recognizes, though he goes to places with which he is familiar.

Joey makes his way back to the night club, where he is surprised to meet another trumpet player who can not only see him, but also recognizes him. He explains that Joey is in "a kind of limbo"; it is all the people he encountered who are actually dead. He offers Joey a choice to return to the living if he so chooses, while reminding him that he must "take what you get and you live with it." With the man's encouragement, Joey decides that he wants to go back, but first he asks for the man's name and the answer is, "Call me Gabe, [...] short for Gabriel."

Joey wakes up on the street after the collision, and is shaken, but uninjured. The nervous driver of the truck quickly pushes some money into Joey's hand, saying that his driving record is on the line. Joey buys his trumpet back. Later that night, he is playing the trumpet, alone on his apartment building's roof, when a young woman whose laundry is hanging there approaches him to express her admiration. She introduces herself as Nan, and says that she is new to the city. After seeing that she is romantically interested in him, an excited Joey offers to show her around town.

Closing narration

Production notes
Beginning with this episode and lasting through the end of the season, a new title sequence featuring a blinking eye was shown. It featured shorter narration than the original opening. Also, these episodes featured a different star field at the conclusion, which looked more like blinking light bulbs than stars.

In his "limbo" state, Joey's reflection is supposed to be absent from any mirrors, but his reflection is clearly seen twice - once in the window of the theater ticket counter and the other in a jukebox against which he was leaning.

Uan Rasey, a veteran studio trumpeter, played for Jack on the soundtrack.

References

Further reading
Zicree, Marc Scott: The Twilight Zone Companion. Sillman-James Press, 1982 (second edition)
DeVoe, Bill. (2008). Trivia from The Twilight Zone. Albany, GA: Bear Manor 5 Media. 
Grams, Martin. (2008). The Twilight Zone: Unlocking the Door to a Television Classic. Churchville, MD: OTR Publishing.

External links

1960 American television episodes
Television episodes about angels
Television episodes set in New York City
Television episodes written by Rod Serling
The Twilight Zone (1959 TV series season 1) episodes